Corsarios de Campeche is a Mexican football club that plays in the Liga TDP.  The club is based in Campeche City, Campeche and was founded on September 6, 1981.

Roster

See also
Football in Mexico

References

External links
 

Football clubs in Campeche
Campeche City
Association football clubs established in 1981
1981 establishments in Mexico